This is a list of countries by their number of billionaire residents, based on annual assessments of the net worth in United States Dollars of wealthy individuals worldwide.

Forbes

Knight Frank's Wealth Report

Hurun Global Rich List

See also

 List of cities by number of billionaires
 List of countries by number of millionaires
 List of countries by share of income of the richest one percent 
 The World's Billionaires
 Millionaire
 List of wealthiest families

References

Lists of people by wealth
Lists of countries by economic indicator